Richard "Gert" Sibande (born 1907 near Ermelo, Mpumalanga, died 1987) was a South African political activist. He was one of the ANC co-accused to stand trial in the treason trial of 1956-61 alongside Nelson Mandela and 154 others.

Sibande played a critical role in the Potato Boycott of 1959.

The Gert Sibande district in Mpumalanga province of South Africa is named after him. He was born in the district and spent a large part of his life there.

Early life
Gert Sibande was born in the Ermelo District in 1907. He was the son of a tenant farmer. Gert Sibande did not receive any form of formal schooling. He taught himself to be literate in isiZulu.

Activism
Gert Sibande was nicknamed 'Lion of the East' due to his political activities in Mpumalanga. As a farm labourer in the Bethel District, Gert Sibande began to organise farmworkers against unsatisfactory working conditions in Bethel. He founded a farm workers association and was a local African National Congress spokesperson. In 1947, he disguised himself as a farmworker to investigate the working conditions of farmworkers in Bethel. He invited journalist, Ruth First as well as Michael Scott (priest) to assist him in exposing the near slavery conditions of farmworkers in Bethal farms . The findings were published in the New Age. The Guardian released a second article related to Gert Sibande's findings on the 25th of December 1947. Drum Magazine released a similar article in 1952, the journalist Henry Nxumalo and photographer Jurgen Schoodeberg played an active role in documenting the conditions of potato farm labourers  in Bethel. This article received national and international attention however, the reports were dismissed by the Minister of Native affairs, Hendrik Frensch Verwoerd in Parliament. He was deported from Bethel by authorities in 1953 due to his political activism. He later moved to Swaziland where he assisted the ANC military wing uMkhonto we Sizwe. In 1959, twelve years after Gert Sibande revealed the labourers conditions, the ANC reported similar conditions in maize and other potato farms. He was an active participant of the defiance campaign, the campaign against Bantu education and also helped draft the Freedom Charter. He worked closely with Chief Albert Luthuli, Moses Kotane and Moses Mabhida. He was a member of the National Executive Council of the ANC and during his term of leadership, was accused in the Treason Trial of 1956-1961. He was one of the few accused  that took the witness stand during the trial. He was elected to be the provincial president of the Transvaal ANC in 1958 and again re-elected in 1959. He died in Swaziland in 1987. He was buried in Manzini in central Swaziland.

Honours
The local municipality changed its name from the "Eastvaal" (Afrikaans: Oosvaal) to "Gert Sibande" District Municipality in October 2004. There is a Gert Sibande TVET College with various campus sites. There is a bronze statue of Gert Sibande that looks at another statue of Nokuthula Simelane in Bethel. The statues are just outside the Nomoya Masilela Museum which is dedicated to freedom fighters including Gert Sibande, Nokuthula Simelane, Ruth First and Henry Nxumalo. Mbongeni Ngema wrote and directed the R22 million budget stage production 'Lion of the East' which was centralised around the potato boycott and Gert Sibande's contributions. The production also had bookings in Trinidad, Jamaica and Suriname. Sibande's family issued an interdict against the musical production as they claimed that they had not been consulted. The interdict was set aside soon before the release of the production.

See also
Defiance Campaign
uMkhonto we Sizwe
Ruth First
Treason Trial
1956 Treason Trial

References 

1907 births
1987 deaths
People from Gert Sibande District Municipality
African National Congress politicians
South African activists
Opposition to apartheid in South Africa
Events associated with apartheid
Civil disobedience
Protests in South Africa
Members of the Order of Luthuli